Shinji Nakano (中野 信治, born 1 April 1971) is a Japanese professional racing driver.

His father, Tsuneharu, was also a racing driver. He competed in the All-Japan Formula Three Championship.

Racing career

Pre Formula One Career

Formula One Career

Nakano made his debut at the 1997 Australian Grand Prix in Melbourne for the Prost Grand Prix team, owned by legendary four times Formula One World Champion Alain Prost. The  season saw him score two world championship points with a pair of sixth places.

With his place at Prost heavily reliant on their engine partners Mugen-Honda, Nakano was dropped in favour of Jarno Trulli, with the second cockpit taken by Olivier Panis, when Prost switched to Peugeot engines. He subsequently joined Minardi for the  season, alongside Esteban Tuero. 

Nakano struggled in the under-powered, under-financed Italian team. He failed to score any points in 1998 and bowed out of Formula One racing for good at his home Grand Prix at Suzuka, Japan, having contested a total of 33 Grands Prix. He spent  as an occasional test driver for the Jordan team, which also used Mugen-Honda engines.

After Formula One
After Formula One, Nakano went to race in Champ Car for Walker Racing and Fernandez Racing. He made 56 starts from 2000 to 2002 with a best points finish of 17th in 2002 and a best race result of 4th at the 2002 Molson Indy Toronto. He also started 15th in the 2003 Indianapolis 500 for Beck Motorsports, finishing 14th. He competed in the 2006 and 2008 24 Hours of Le Mans races and returned to the event in 2011 with OAK Racing and 2012 with the Boutsen Ginon squad.

Helmet
Nakano's helmet was black with a black circle on the top surrounded by a white halo, with a red and silver flame design surrounding the visor and a black and silver checkered flag behind of it, in CART he changed the black for white, the halo became blue, the black circle became red, the checkered flag disappeared and the flame became red with blue outline. in LeMans, he added more flames in the point where the checkered flag was.

Career statistics

Complete Japanese Formula 3000/Formula Nippon results
(key) (Races in bold indicate pole position; races in italics indicate fastest lap)

Complete Formula One results
(key)

 Driver did not finish the Grand Prix, but was classified as they had completed over 90% of the race distance.

Complete American Open-Wheel Racing results
(key)

CART

IRL IndyCar Series

24 Hours of Le Mans results

Complete FIA World Endurance Championship results

References

External links

 Shinji Nakano official website
 

1971 births
Living people
People from Takatsuki, Osaka
Sportspeople from Osaka Prefecture
Japanese racing drivers
Japanese Formula One drivers
Champ Car drivers
IndyCar Series drivers
Indianapolis 500 drivers
Japanese Formula 3000 Championship drivers
Formula Nippon drivers
Japanese Formula 3 Championship drivers
Minardi Formula One drivers
Prost Formula One drivers
24 Hours of Le Mans drivers
Super GT drivers
European Le Mans Series drivers
FIA World Endurance Championship drivers
Asian Le Mans Series drivers
Japanese IndyCar Series drivers
Nakajima Racing drivers
Mugen Motorsports drivers
Epsilon Euskadi drivers
OAK Racing drivers
Manor Motorsport drivers
Team Kunimitsu drivers
Walker Racing drivers
Alan Docking Racing drivers